George McLellan (born 6 September 1940) is a New Zealand cricketer. He played in two first-class matches for Wellington from 1965 to 1968.

See also
 List of Wellington representative cricketers

References

External links
 

1940 births
Living people
New Zealand cricketers
Wellington cricketers
Cricketers from Wellington City